Ukrainka (derived from the word Ukraine) may refer to:

People
Lesya Ukrainka (1871–1913), Ukrainian poet and writer

Places
Russia
Ukrainka, Seryshevsky District, Amur Oblast
Ukrainka (air base), military air base in Russian Far East

Ukraine
Ukrainka, Kherson Oblast, a village in Beryslav Raion, Kherson Oblast
Ukrainka, Halytsynove rural hromada, Mykolaiv Raion, Mykolaiv Oblast, a village in Mykolaiv Raion, Mykolaiv Oblast
Ukrainka, Kobleve rural hromada, Mykolaiv Raion, Mykolaiv Oblast, a village in Mykolaiv Raion, Mykolaiv Oblast
Ukrainka, Kyiv Oblast, a city in Kyiv Oblast